The Third Army was originally established in Skopje and later defended the northeastern provinces of the Ottoman Empire. Its initial headquarters was at Salonica, where it formed the core of the military forces that supported the Young Turk Revolution of 1908. Many of its officers who participated in the Revolution, including Enver Pasha and Mustafa Kemal Atatürk, rose to fame and power.

By 1911, the Army had been moved to Erzincan in northeastern Anatolia, and with the onset of World War I, it was moved to Erzurum. During the war, it fought against the Russian Caucasus Army, Armenian volunteer units and behind the lines dealt with the Armenian Resistance within its designated area. During this period, the Battle of Sarikamish, Battle of Koprukoy and the Battle of Erzurum were significant engagements. The army's headquarters was moved to Susehir (a town near Sivas) after the disastrous Battle of Erzurum, and by late 1916 the army lacked any offensive capability. After the Russian Revolution, the Russian Caucasus Army disintegrated.

Between 1917 and 1918 it advanced against forces of the Armenian national liberation movement established by Armenian Congress of Eastern Armenians which became the Armenian Army with the declaration of the Democratic Republic of Armenia. During this period, the Third Army engaged the Armenian forces at Sardarapat, Abaran, and Karakilisa.

Formations

Order of Battle, 1908 
After the Young Turk Revolution and the establishment of the  Second Constitutional Era on July 3, 1908, the new government initiated a major military reform. Army headquarters were modernized. Its operational area was Western Rumelia, and it had units in Europe (Albania, Kosovo, Macedonia) and Minor Asia (Aydın). It commanded the following active divisions: The Third Army also had inspectorate functions for twelve Redif (reserve) divisions:

Third Army
5th Infantry Division (Beşinci Fırka)
6th Infantry Division (Altıncı Fırka)
17th Infantry Division (On Yedinci Fırka)
18th Infantry Division (On Sekizinci Fırka)
3rd Cavalry Division (Üçüncü Süvari Fırkası)
Fortress Artillery Battalion x 4
 Redif divisions of the Third Army (name of the division denotes its location)
9th Monastir Reserve Infantry Division (Dokuzuncu Manastır Redif Fırkası)
10th Köprülü Reserve Infantry Division (Onuncu Köprülü Redif Fırkası)
11th Salonika Reserve Infantry Division (On Birinci Selânik Redif Fırkası)
12th Aydın Reserve Infantry Division (On İkinci Aydın Redif Fırkası)
28th Üsküp Reserve Infantry Division (Yirmi Sekizinci Üsküp Redif Fırkası)
29th Pirştine Reserve Infantry Division (Yirmi Dokuzuncu Pirştine Redif Fırkası)
30th Pirzerin Reserve Infantry Division (Otuzuncu Pirzerin Redif Fırkası)
31st Serez Reserve Infantry Division (Otuz Birinci Serez Redif Fırkası)
32nd Berat Reserve Infantry Division (Otuz İkinci Berat Redif Fırkası)
33rd Görüce Reserve Infantry Division (Otuz Üçüncü Görüce Redif Fırkası)
34th Debre-i Bala Reserve Infantry Division (Otuz Dördüncü Debre-i Bala Redif Fırkası)
54th Gevgili Reserve Infantry Division (Elli Dördüncü Gevgili Redif Fırkası)

Order of Battle, 1911
With further reorganizations of the Ottoman Army, to include the creation of corps level headquarters, by 1911 the Army was headquartered in Erzincan. The Army before the First Balkan War in 1911 was structured as such:

Army Headquarters, Erzincan
IX Corps, Erzurum
28th Infantry Division, Erzurum
29th Infantry Division, Bayburt
X Corps, Erzincan
30th Infantry Division, Erzincan
31st Infantry Division, Erzincan
32nd Infantry Division, Mamuret'ül Aziz
XI Corps, Van
33rd Infantry Division, Van
34th Infantry Division, Muş
1st Tribal Cavalry Division, Erzurum
39th Cavalry Regiment, Erzurum
1st Tribal Cavalry Regiment, Erzurum
2nd Tribal Cavalry Regiment, Kiğı
3rd Tribal Cavalry Regiment, Varto
4th Tribal Cavalry Regiment, Hınıs
5th Tribal Cavalry Regiment, Hasankale
6th Tribal Cavalry Regiment, Sivas
2nd Tribal Cavalry Division, Kara Kilise
24th Cavalry Regiment, Kara Kilise
7th Tribal Cavalry Regiment, Eleşkirt
8th Tribal Cavalry Regiment, Kara Kilise
9th Tribal Cavalry Regiment, Kara Kilise
10th Tribal Cavalry Regiment, Kara Kilise
11th Tribal Cavalry Regiment, Kara Kilise
12th Tribal Cavalry Regiment, Tutak
13th Tribal Cavalry Regiment, Diyadin
14th Tribal Cavalry Regiment, Beyazıt
3rd Tribal Cavalry Division, Erdiş
25th Cavalry Regiment, Erdiş
15th Tribal Cavalry Regiment, Kop
16th Tribal Cavalry Regiment, Erdiş
17th Tribal Cavalry Regiment, Erdiş
18th Tribal Cavalry Regiment, Saray
19th Tribal Cavalry Regiment, Başkale
4th Tribal Cavalry Division, Mardin
20th Cavalry Regiment, Mardin
20th Tribal Cavalry Regiment, Cezire-i İbn-i Ömer
21st Tribal Cavalry Regiment, Mardin
22nd Tribal Cavalry Regiment, Mardin
23rd Tribal Cavalry Regiment, Viranşehir
24th Tribal Cavalry Regiment, Siverek

Order of Battle, 1914 
The acting commander Hasan Izzet Pasha (October–December 1914) and Enver Pasha (December 1914 – January 1915). Prior to Sarikamish, the Army consisted of 118,660 troops in the following units and commanders:

IX Corps - Ahmed Fevzi Pasha
17th Infantry Division
28th Infantry Division
29th Infantry Division
X Corps - Hafiz Hakki Pasha
30th Infantry Division
31st Infantry Division
32nd Infantry Division
XI Corps - Abdulkerim Pasha
18th Infantry Division
33rd Infantry Division
34th Infantry Division
2nd Cavalry Brigade
Van Cavalry Brigade

Following the battle of Sarikamish, it was reduced to some 20,000 men with loss of all guns and heavy equipment.

Order of Battle, 1915 

The acting commander Hafiz Hakki Pasha (January 12 – February 1915) died of typhus in Erzerum in 1915. Mahmut Kamil Paşa (February 1915 – February 1916) took the command.

In 1915 the 3rd Army was slowly brought back up to strength. In July of that year, it was strong enough to win a victory against the Russians at Malazgirt. Later in the year the losses the Ottomans took at Gallipoli diverted manpower away from the 3rd Army, and it would never again reach its normal strength, and numbered 60,000 in the fall of 1915.

Order of Battle, 1916 
The acting commander Vehip Pasha (February 1916–June 1918).

IX Corps
17th Infantry Division
28th Infantry Division
29th Infantry Division
X Corps
30th Infantry Division
31st Infantry Division
32nd Infantry Division
XI Corps
18th Infantry Division
33rd Infantry Division
34th Infantry Division
36th Infantry Division
37th Infantry Division

also: 2nd Cavalry Division, 15-20 battalions of frontier guards and gendarmes, and a few thousand Kurdish irregular.

When the Russians launched their surprise offensive in January 1916, culminating in the Battle of Koprukoy the army numbered 65,000 men and 100 guns. The army lost nearly 15,000 killed, wounded, for frozen, and about 5,000 prisoners.  There were also about an estimated 5,000 deserters.  About 20-30 guns were lost.  The XI Corps took the heaviest losses, about 70% of its effective strength.  The army fell back on the fortified city of Erzurum, its base.

The army could expect reinforcements from the 1st and 2nd Armies after their victory at Gallipoli, but due to the poor nature of the Ottoman railroad it was going to take time for them to reach the 3rd Army.  The army numbered about 50,000 troops.  The army was also short machine guns and needed more artillery to properly defend the city.  Mahmut Kamil returned from leave and resumed command of the army from Abdul Kerim.

The Russians stormed the city, penetrating its outer defenses, forcing Mahmut Kamil to abandon the city and retreat to the west.  The army numbered perhaps 25,000 men and 30 or 40 guns.  Morale was very poor.  Mahmut Kamil was replaced by Vehip Pasa.  The army continued to retreat, losing Trebizond on the coast.  A counterattack by the army was unable to retake the city.

In July 1916 the Russians launched another series of attacks on the 3rd Army, costing the army about 30% of its strength and leaving its morale badly shaken.  By September 1916 the army was very weak and desertions were a major problem.  By October there were an estimated 50,000 deserters in the rear of the army.  The 3rd Army could not play any role in the Ottoman offensives planned for that fall.

Order of Battle, 1917 
The acting commander Vehib Pasha (February 1916–June 1918).

The army underwent a major reorganization at the winter of 1916. At the turn of 1917, it was reorganized as follows:

I Caucasian Corps
9th Caucasian Division
10th Caucasian Division
36th Caucasian Division
II Caucasian corps
5th Caucasian Division
11th Caucasian Division
37th Caucasian Division

Over the winter of 1916–17, the Russian Revolution effectively stopped the Russian Army in its tracks, and eventually caused the Russian Army in the Caucasus to melt away.

The Third Army later advanced and recaptured in 1917 and 1918 all that it had lost, and even advanced to and captured Kars, which had been lost to the Russians in 1877. These actions achieved what the Ottomans had wanted at Brest-Litovsk by regaining the Ottoman Empire's prewar boundaries under the Treaty of Batum.

References 

Field armies of the Ottoman Empire
Salonica vilayet
Erzurum vilayet
Military units and formations of the Ottoman Empire in World War I